Australluma peschii is a species of plant in the family Apocynaceae. It is native to Angola and Namibia. Its natural habitat is dry savanna. It is threatened by habitat loss.

References

peschii
Flora of Angola
Flora of Namibia
Least concern plants
Taxonomy articles created by Polbot
Plants described in 1935